Government performance management (GPM) consists of a set of processes that help government organizations optimize their business performance. It provides a framework for organizing, automating, and analyzing business methodologies, metrics, processes and systems that drive business performance. Some commentators see GPM as the next generation of business intelligence (BI) for governments. GPM helps governments to make use of their financial, human, material, and other resources.  In the past, owners have sought to drive strategy down and across their organizations; they have struggled to transform strategies into actionable metrics and they have grappled with meaningful analysis to expose the cause-and-effect relationships that, if understood, could give profitable insight to their operational decision-makers.  GPM software and methods allow a systematic, integrated approach that links government strategy to core processes and activities. "Running by the numbers" now means something: planning, budgeting, analysis, and reporting can give the measurements that empower management decisions.

Performance management (PM) market 
According to Gartner, the Enterprise Performance Management (EPM) suite market continued to experience strong momentum, growing 19% during 2007. This is slightly in advance of their earlier market sizing and forecast analysis, which anticipated 2007 revenue to be $1.836 million, representing an 18% year-over-year growth. In the latest forecast, Gartner believe that the market for EPM will be more than $3 billion by 2011, representing a 14.4% compound annual growth rate. Several factors contributed to the continued significant growth in EPM revenue during 2007:
 Many organizations replaced difficult-to-maintain, inflexible, or outmoded spreadsheets and homegrown financial applications.
 Continued growth in large enterprises was fueled by desires to achieve greater transparency and adherence to governance and compliance legislation.
 Increased demand for applications that support strategic plans and operational activities drove new momentum in the deployment of scorecards.
 There was increased demand from mid-size enterprises, representing one of the largest untapped and dynamic areas of the business application software sector.
 Advertising and PR from increasingly large vendors and system integrators are raising the EPM profile and generating greater demand.

Gartner expected the business Intelligence software market to reach $3 billion by 2009. "Companies around the world have purchased more than US$40 billion worth of enterprise applications, including ERP, CRM and HR, during the past few years," said Colleen Graham, principal research analyst at Gartner. "This has generated significant volumes of data in support of the operational processes they automate. By investing in BI, companies can further leverage their enterprise application investments and turn the torrent of data into meaningful insight to better measure performance, respond more quickly to market changes and opportunities and comply with an increasingly complex regulatory environment." In 2017, Gartner predicted that the business intelligence and analytics software market could reach $22.8 billion by the end of 2020.

References

External links
 Download Microsoft Government Performance Management from Official Microsoft Download Center
Business intelligence
Data management